Cook County Board of Commissioners 11th district is a electoral district for the Cook County Board of Commissioners.

The district was established in 1994, when the board transitioned from holding elections in individual districts, as opposed to the previous practice of holding a set of two at-large elections (one for ten seats from the city of Chicago and another for seven seats from suburban Cook County).

Geography

1994 boundaries

2001 redistricting
New boundaries were adopted in August 2001, with redistricting taking place following the 2000 United States Census.

In regards to townships and equivalent jurisdictions, the district's redistricted boundaries included portions of the city of Chicago and portions of the Stickney and Worth townships.

2012 redistricting
The district, as redistricted in 2012 following the 2010 United States Census, included Bedford Park, Bridgeview, Burbank, Chicago, Evergreen Park, Hometown, and Oak Lawn.

In regards to townships and equivalent jurisdictions, it included portions of the city of Chicago, and portions of the Stickney and Worth townships.

The district was 42.59 square miles (27,259.26 acres).

Politics
The district has only ever been represented by Democrat John P. Daley. He was won all of his elections by large margins.

List of commissioners representing the district

Election results

|-
| colspan=16 style="text-align:center;" |Cook County Board of Commissioners 11th district general elections
|-
!Year
!Winning candidate
!Party
!Vote (pct)
!Opponent
!Party
! Vote (pct)
!Opponent
!Party
! Vote (pct)
|-
|1994
| |John P. Daley
| | Democratic
| | 
|
|
|
|
|
|
|-
|1998
| |John P. Daley
| | Democratic
| | 70,457 (76.49%)
| | William Walsh
| | Republican
| | 21,654 (23.51%)
|
|
|
|-
|2002
| |John P. Daley
| | Democratic
| |69,422 (75.85%)
| | William Walsh
| | Republican
| | 22,099 (24.15%)
|
|
|
|-
|2006
| |John P. Daley
| | Democratic
| |65,846 (79.49%)
| | Carl Segvich
| | Republican
| | 16,986 (20.51%)
|
|
|
|-
|2010
| |John P. Daley
| | Democratic
| |56,711 (69.97%)
| | Carl Segvich
| | Republican
| | 24,340 (30.03%)
|
|
|
|-
|2014
| |John P. Daley
| | Democratic
| |54,093 (68.61%)
| | Carl Segvich
| | Republican
| | 24,744 (31.39%)
|
|
|
|-
|2018
| |John P. Daley
| | Democratic
| |71,997 (73.56%)
| | Steven S. Graves
| | Republican
| | 25,872 (26.44%)
|
|
|
|-
|2022
| |John P. Daley
| | Democratic
| |48,435 (62.68%)
| | Declan J. Smith
| | Republican
| | 26,029 (33.68%)
| | Brandon Sizelove
| | Libertarian
| | 2,815 (3.64%)

References

Cook County Board of Commissioners districts
Constituencies established in 1994
1994 establishments in Illinois